The 1916 Kentucky Derby was the 42nd running of the Kentucky Derby. The race took place on May 13, 1916.

Full results

Winning Breeder: Jack P. Chinn & Frederick A. Forsythe; (KY)
Horses St. Isidore, Bulse, and Huffaker scratched before the race.

Payout

 The winner received a purse of $9,750.
 Second place received $2,000.
 Third place received $1,000.
 Fourth place received $225.

References

1916
Kentucky Derby
Derby
May 1916 sports events